Franck Gava (born 3 February 1970) is a French former professional footballer who played as an attacking midfielder.

Club career
Gava was born in Montargis, Loiret. He emerged through AS Nancy-Lorraine's youth system, making his professional debuts at age 17. However, he would grow to prominence in the first division at Olympique Lyonnais, being a very valuable offensive unit alongside Florian Maurice.

In 1997, Gava signed - alongside close friend Maurice - with capital side Paris Saint-Germain, scoring seven goals in his first season and helping the club capture both the Cup and League cup that year.

After that, he played with AS Monaco FC and Stade Rennais one season apiece, being forced to retire at 30 due to foot ailments; he did amass more than 400 official matches counting both major divisions in France.

International career
Gava collected three caps for France in a one-year span, all in friendlies and as a substitute; the first arrived on 9 October 1996, against Turkey.

References

External links

 
 
French Football Federation profile 

1970 births
Living people
People from Montargis
Sportspeople from Loiret
French footballers
Association football midfielders
Ligue 1 players
Ligue 2 players
AS Nancy Lorraine players
Olympique Lyonnais players
Paris Saint-Germain F.C. players
AS Monaco FC players
Stade Rennais F.C. players
France international footballers
Footballers from Centre-Val de Loire